Bethel African Methodist Episcopal Church was a historic African Methodist Episcopal church located at 820 Clay Street in Parkersburg, Wood County, West Virginia.  It was built in 1887 and was a two-story, stucco building in a vernacular interpretation of the Gothic Revival style.  It was one of three black churches in Parkersburg and was the oldest black church building in west-central West Virginia. The church was located in a neighborhood of late 19th-century wood-frame houses only a block from downtown.

It was added to the National Register of Historic Places in 1998.  It is presumed to have been demolished or moved since then.

References

African-American history of West Virginia
African Methodist Episcopal churches in West Virginia
Churches in Wood County, West Virginia
Demolished buildings and structures in West Virginia
Gothic Revival church buildings in West Virginia
Churches on the National Register of Historic Places in West Virginia
Churches completed in 1887
Buildings and structures in Parkersburg, West Virginia
National Register of Historic Places in Wood County, West Virginia